The Murphy's Cup was a golf tournament on the European Tour from 1989 to 1991.

In its inaugural year it was held opposite the PLM Open and listed on the tour schedule as an "Approved Special Event". As such it did not count towards the Order of Merit, and Hugh Baiocchi's victory is not recognised as an official tour win. In 1990 it was elevated to full tour status.

The Murphy's Cup used Stableford scoring, with a modified version of the points system being operated in 1990 and 1991: two points were awarded for birdie, four for an eagle and six for an albatross, while one point was deducted for a bogey and two for a double bogey or worse.

Winners

References

External links
Coverage on the European Tour's official site

Former European Tour events
Golf tournaments in England
Golf tournaments in Wales